The Real Group is an a cappella group from Sweden. Members are Clara Fornander, Joanné Pastor Nugas, Johannes Rückert Becker, Axel Berntzon and Daniele Dees. The group's members compose and arrange most of their songs. They sing in English and Swedish and cite American vocalist Bobby McFerrin as an inspiration.

Background

The Real Group has performed more than 2000 concerts worldwide. In 2002 The Real Group performed at the opening ceremony of the FIFA World Cup in Seoul, South Korea to an audience of 60,000. On 22 December 1993, to celebrate the fiftieth birthday of Queen Silvia of Sweden, The Real Group backed up former ABBA member Anni-Frid Lyngstad in a performance of the ABBA hit "Dancing Queen", using an a cappella arrangement that was released on the album Varför får man inte bara vara som man är.

The Real Group was formed in 1984 when its members were students at the Royal College of Music in Stockholm. All of them attended Adolf Fredrik's Music School. Margareta Bengtson was the soprano in the group at its inception, but she left to work on solo albums in 2006. Johanna Nyström filled her spot for some time until Emma Nilsdotter replaced her in 2008 and had her first appearance with the group in Kremlin Palace. Johanna Nyström also filled in for both Margareta Bengtson and Katarina Henryson when they were on maternity leave or otherwise away. Morten Vinther Sørensen joined the group in 2010 to replace Peder Karlsson, who shifted his focus to develop The Real Academy. In 2015 Jānis Strazdiņš joined the group as the bass after Anders Jalkéus retired due to health reasons.

On 19 January 2016 the Real Group announced that Lisa Östergren would replace Katarina Henryson.

Vocal ranges of previous members 
Margareta Bengtson: F3-G5
Johanna Nyström
Peder Karlsson: E2-C5
Anders Jalkéus
Katarina Henryson: D3-C5

Discography

Awards and honors 
 Contemporary A Cappella Recording Awards (CARAs):
 1995: Best Contemporary Cover: "Dancing Queen" from Varför får man inte bara vara som man är
 1995: Best Jazz Song: "Flight of the Foo-Birds" from Varför får man inte bara vara som man är
 1996: Best Female Vocalist: Margareta Bengtson
 1997: Live Album of the Year: Live in Stockholm
 1997: Best Original Pop Song: "Jag Vill Va Med Dig"
 1997: Best Jazz Song: "Waltz for Debby"
 1997: Best Female Vocalist: Margareta Bengtson
 1998: Best Holiday Album: En riktig jul
 2003: Best Classical Album: Stämning
 2003: Runner Up for Best Classical Song: "En vänlig grönskas rika dräkt" from Stämning
 2004: Best Holiday Album: Julen er her
 2004: Best Holiday Song: "Hark, the Herald Angels Sing" from Julen er her
 Other awards:
 2002 Karamelodiktstipendiet , an annual award given to a Swedish entertainer by Povel Ramel.

Timeline
Vertical lines are records, red line is the new generation TRG.

References

External links 

 

Swedish jazz ensembles
Professional a cappella groups
ACT Music artists
Vocal jazz ensembles
1984 establishments in Sweden
Musical groups established in 1984
English-language singers from Sweden